Rovshan Bayramov (born 7 May 1987, Baku, Azerbaijani SSR) is an Azerbaijani wrestler. He is a European and world champion in Greco-Roman wrestling. Moreover, he is a two-time Olympic silver medalist.

In the 2011 World Wrestling Championship held in Istanbul, he was a world champion adding a gold medal to the combination of the silver and bronze medals obtained in the previous world championships. In addition, Bayramov holds two European titles.

2008 Beijing Olympics
In the 2008 Beijing Olympics, Bayramov successfully reached the final having beaten Mostafa Mohamed (Egypt), Yagnier Hernández (Cuba), Roman Amoyan (Armenia), but lost to Nazyr Mankiev from Russia.

2012 London Olympics
In the 2012 London Olympics having beaten Mingiyan Semenov (Russia), Spenser Mango (USA), Li Shujin (China) and Choi Gyu-Jin (South Korea), Bayramov lost in the final against Hamid Sourian (Iran) and obtained his second silver Olympic medal in a row.

References

External links

 
 

1987 births
Living people
Azerbaijani male sport wrestlers
Olympic wrestlers of Azerbaijan
Wrestlers at the 2008 Summer Olympics
Wrestlers at the 2012 Summer Olympics
Wrestlers at the 2016 Summer Olympics
Olympic silver medalists for Azerbaijan
Olympic medalists in wrestling
Medalists at the 2012 Summer Olympics
Medalists at the 2008 Summer Olympics
World Wrestling Championships medalists
European Wrestling Championships medalists